The California Franchise Tax Board (FTB) administers and collects state personal income tax and corporate franchise and income tax of California. It is part of the California Government Operations Agency.

The board is composed of the California State Controller, the director of the California Department of Finance, and the chair of the California State Board of Equalization. The chief administrative official is the executive officer of the Franchise Tax Board.

History
In 1879 California adopted its state constitution which among many other programs created the State Board of Equalization and the State Controller, which administered all tax programs.

In 1929, the state legislature created the office of the Franchise Tax Commissioner to administer California's Bank and Corporation Franchise Tax Act.

In 1950, California abolished the office of the Franchise Tax Commissioner and created the Franchise Tax Board as it exists today.

The Executive Officers of the Franchise Tax Board have been:
John J. Campbell (1950–1963)
Martin Huff (1963–1979)
Jeffrey Smith (Acting Executive Officer during the first eight months of 1980)
Gerald H. Goldberg (1980–2005)
Will Bush (Interim Executive Officer during the last five months of 2005)
Selvi Stanislaus (2006–present), the first woman to hold the post

Members

The three members are the State Controller, Chair of the Board of Equalization, and the Director of the Department of Finance.  The State Controller and the Chair of the Board of Equalization are elected officials while the Director of the Department of Finance is appointed by the Governor of California.

Notes

Tax programs

Personal income tax
The FTB collects personal state income taxes.  The FTB collects income taxes from California residents on their income from all sources.  Meanwhile, non-residents are taxed on their California-based income.  In recent years, the FTB collects more than $50 billion each year in personal income taxes.

Corporate income tax
The FTB levies a franchise tax on businesses for doing business in California. The FTB's name reflects the fact that it was originally created to collect this tax. The agency's name was left unchanged even after the state created a personal income tax and added it to the FTB's responsibilities.

The corporate tax is imposed on businesses that do business in California and derive income from within California.  Over the past decade, the FTB has collected an average of $9.5 billion per year in corporate income taxes.

Non-tax programs
The FTB also collects delinquent vehicle registration debt collections on behalf of the California Department of Motor Vehicles and delinquent court ordered debt. The FTB also does financial audits of certain candidates for state office, ballot proposition committees, and lobbyists, according to a random selection process by the California Fair Political Practices Commission.

See also
State income tax
State tax levels
Taxation in the United States

References

External links
California Franchise Tax Board website
 Franchise Tax Board in the California Code of Regulations
Revenue and Tax Code

Franchise Tax Board
Taxation in California
US state tax agencies
Government agencies established in 1950
1950 establishments in California